is a Japanese video game localization company based in Shibuya, Tokyo. The company was founded in 2005 by Hiroko Minamoto and former Electronic Gaming Monthly (EGM) editor John Ricciardi. They were joined by Ricciardi's EGM colleague Mark MacDonald in 2008, who departed in 2016 to work as VP, Production of Business and Development at Enhance Games. It performs Japanese-to-English and English-to-Japanese translation and localization on a contract basis with credits including Monster Hunter, Nier, Dragon Quest, Fire Emblem, Tales, Undertale and more. The company is named after the final level of Super Mario Bros.

Translation
8-4 generally gets involved in the localization process midway through a game's development, gaining access to a build of the game and script. Occasionally, they are invited to participate throughout the development cycle, as with the case of Shadows of the Damned. As publishers increasingly push for simultaneous worldwide release, they have noted earlier and earlier involvement in projects. In the first step of the process, they familiarize themselves with the game and others in its series by playing through them multiple times and taking notes. To perform the actual translation, they use large Microsoft Excel spreadsheets containing the script in both Japanese and English. In addition to word translation, they suggest changes to make the game more accessible to Western audiences. For example, in Glory of Heracles, they recommended that the battle speed be tripled in order to make fighting more exciting.

The team cites Richard Honeywood, founder of Square's localization department, as an influence on their translation style. Beyond merely translating the words, 8-4 attempts to convey the same experience as that of the original language version through attention to tone, user interface, and cultural references. Because of their text-heavy nature, most of 8-4's contracts are for role-playing video games such as Eternal Sonata, Tales of Vesperia, and Star Ocean: The Last Hope, which are beyond the capabilities of in-house translation teams. In translating Dragon Quest VI: Realms of Revelation, they inherited Honeywood's Dragon Quest style guide to aid them in keeping consistency between games. Speaking of their favorite projects, they look to games like Baten Kaitos Origins where the developers allowed them to take over every aspect of localization including script, debugging, quality assurance, and voice production. In 2022, 8-4 provided the translation for Masahiro Sakurai's YouTube web series, "Masahiro Sakurai on Creating Games".

Games

Podcast
8-4 hosts a bi-weekly podcast dedicated to "Japan, video games, and Japanese video games", known as 8-4 Play. It is hosted by the "8-4some" consisting of Mark MacDonald, John Ricciardi, Sarah Podzorski, and Justin Epperson. Being located in Tokyo, 8-4 has the opportunity to attend and share news about many Japanese video game industry events such as Tokyo Game Show, Capcom's Captivate, and Grasshopper Manufacture's Hoppers. As 1UP.com and EGM alumni, they maintain many of their video game journalism connections including James Mielke (now of Q Entertainment), Shane Bettenhausen (Ignition Entertainment), and David Abrams (Cheap Ass Gamer), who make regular appearances as guests on the show. They also occasionally have prominent designers as guests such as Tetsuya Mizuguchi and Akira Yamaoka. Since 2012, episodes of the podcast have been hosted on Giant Bomb. Following the 2011 Tōhoku earthquake and tsunami, 8-4 was involved in both Grasshopper Manufacture's Grasstream 2 charity event and Play For Japan: The Album, headed by Akira Yamaoka.

References

External links
Official website
1UP.com site

Software companies based in Tokyo
Video game companies established in 2005
Video game companies of Japan
Video game development companies
Video game podcasts
Japanese companies established in 2005
2006 podcast debuts
Audio podcasts